TuS Makkabi Berlin is a German sports club based in Berlin. Established in 1970, the club lays claim to the traditions of predecessor Bar-Kochba Berlin.

History 
Created in 1898, predecessor club Bar Kochba Berlin was one of the largest Jewish organizations in the world by 1930 with over 40,000 members from 24 countries, part of the general Bar Kochba movement intended to promote physical education and Jewish heritage. The club fielded teams in several sports including a football side which competed in the city leagues between 1911 and 1929. In 1924, Lilli Henoch, the world record holder in the discus, shot put, and 4 × 100 meters relay events, trained the women's section in the club.

In 1929 Bar Kochba merged with Hakoah Berlin to form the sports club Bar Kochba-Hakoah. The Hakoah side had enjoyed increasing success, capturing three consecutive lower division championships between 1925 and 1927. They were promoted each time until, by 1928, they were playing first tier football. The newly combined side continued to compete as Hakoah after 1929.

The rise to power of the Nazis in the early 1930s led to discrimination against Jews and by 1933 Jewish teams were excluded from general competition and limited to play in separate leagues or tournaments. In 1938 Jewish teams were banned outright as discrimination turned to persecution.

In the aftermath of World War II Jewish sports and cultural associations eventually re-emerged in Germany. On 26 November 1970 TuS Makkabi Berlin was formed out of the merger of Bar-Kochba Berlin (gymnastics and athletics), Hakoah Berlin (football, re-established 1945) and Makkabi Berlin (boxing). The football side of the club played in third and fourth tier competition in the 1970s and 1980s before leaving to join FV Wannsee in 1987. Wannsee also played as a third and fourth division side until collapsing in the mid-90s and slipping first to the Landesliga Berlin-2 (VI) and then to the Bezirksliga Berlin (VII) by the end of the decade. Makkabi's footballers returned to the fold in 1997 and since 2003 have also played in the Bezirksliga Berlin. In 2006, the club gained promotion to the Verbandsliga Berlin (VI) and has since fluctuated between this league and the Landesliga below, once more returning to the Berlin-Liga in 2016. In 2022, Makkabi won promotion to the NOFV-Oberliga Nord after winning the Berlin-Liga.

Today the sports club has some 500 members and is one of the largest Maccabi associations in the country. The club strongly promotes dialogue between Jews and non-Jews in a sports context.

Anti-semitism 
Jewish sports clubs continue to occasionally meet anti-semitism on the field. In October 2006 during Makkabi's match versus the second team squad of VSG Altglienicke in Berlin's Kreisliga-B, fans and players were reported to have chanted "Gas the Jews", "Auschwitz is back" and "Führer, Führer" as well as other slogans. The case drew extensive media coverage in Germany as well as Israel.

References

External links 
Official
  

Unofficial
 Abseits Guide to German Soccer
 Jewish football teams
 Photographs and stories from a sports day of Maccabi Berlin that took place in 1935 in the athletics, handball and boxing disciplines, in the exhibition "Jews and Sports before the Holocaust" on the Yad Vashem website

Football clubs in Germany
Association football clubs established in 1898
Berlin
Jewish football clubs
Football clubs in Berlin
Jews and Judaism in Berlin
Sports clubs banned by the Nazis
1898 establishments in Germany
Jewish organisations based in Germany